The Salvager is a British reality television show produced by Attaboy Productions and aired on Discovery Real Time. The show ran for two series featuring Rico Daniels a passionate recycler and salvager scouring scrap yards, council tips and charity shops finding scrap metal and wood and transforming them into useful and unusual items. The second series re-titled Le Salvager relies on the same premise but sees Daniels relocate to the Vosges of eastern France. The show is often repeated on Quest and Discovery Shed in the United Kingdom.

The Host 
Daniels was born in Basildon, Essex in 1952. He left school at the age of 15 to become a civil servant but quickly realised it wasn't for him and became an art student. This also displeased Daniels and he eventually became a market trader.

Screen Test 
In 2002 Daniels was invited for a screen test about men and their sheds. Although he was not quite right for the show, the producer liked his unique style and commissioned a series showing his talent for transforming trash into treasures.

Possible Third Series 
In November 2012 Daniels announced on Twitter that he had sent two pitches for a third series of the salvager to Attaboy Productions the production company that made the first two.

Series 1 - The Salvager

Series 2 - Le Salvager

References

2004 British television series debuts
2005 British television series endings
2000s British reality television series